Believe is the fourth studio album by Tongan-American family band The Jets, released on July 8th, 1989, by MCA Records.

It includes the singles "You Better Dance", "The Same Love", Somebody to Love Me", and "Under Any Moon". The album peaked at No. 107 on the Billboard 200.

Critical reception
The Star Tribune called Believe the band's "most consistent LP," writing that "like the Miami Sound Machine, the Jets divide their repertoire between middleweight, made-for-radio dance music and middle-of-the-road ballads."

Track listing
 "You Better Dance" – 3:50
 "Somebody to Love Me" – 3:46
 "How Can I Be Sure" – 3:46
 "The Same Love" – 3:58
 "In My Dreams" – 4:07
 "Under Any Moon" (with Glenn Medeiros) – 3:48
 "Emotional" – 3:48
 "Believe in Love" – 3:59
 "Do You Remember" – 3:56
 "Leave It to Me" – 3:32
 "You've Got Another Boyfriend" – 4:20

Singles released
 "You Better Dance" b/w "Do You Remember" – number 28 US Dance, number 59 US Hot 100, number 73 US R&B
 "The Same Love" b/w "Can't Get Over You" – number 15 US Adult Contemporary, number 87 US Hot 100
 "Somebody to Love Me" b/w "You're So Right" – number 35 US Adult Contemporary, number 89 US R&B
 "Under Any Moon" b/w "You're My Woman, You're My Lady" by Glenn Medeiros

References

1989 albums
The Jets (band) albums